Nicotine pouches (also called modern oral nicotine products) are white pouches containing nicotine among other ingredients. They do not include tobacco leaf, dust, or stem. The nicotine may either be derived from tobacco plants or may be synthetic. Nicotine pouches are described as either similar to or a tobacco-free version of snus.

To use a nicotine pouch, the user puts a pouch between the upper lip and gum, and leaves it there while the nicotine and taste is being released. When finished, the pouch is disposed of. Many brands have a storage area in the top case (a ‘catch lid’) where used pouches can be kept if no trash can is readily available. The small pouches are not like chewing tobacco, as the user does not need to spit, since the contents of the pouches stay inside the pouches during use. No combustion is involved during use.

There is limited independent testing of the constituents, exposure, or biomarkers of effects for nicotine pouches although independent research is now emerging. The pouches are sold in an array of flavors. Many of the brands of nicotine pouches are made by major big tobacco companies (e.g., Swedish Match makes Zyn, British American Tobacco makes Lyft and Velo, Imperial Tobacco makes Skruf and ZoneX, Japan Tobacco International makes Nordic Spirit, Philip Morris International makes Shiro, and Altria owns 80% of On!).

Usage 
While relatively new, nicotine pouches share similarities with Swedish snus. The first pouch product was developed in the beginning of the 2000 by a small start up company Niconovum. This company registered the product 2008 as a medicinal nicotine replacement product (Zonnic) with 2 mg of nicotine. In 2009, RJ Reynolds (now British American Tobacco) bought Niconovum. Thereafter tobacco companies, particularly Swedish Match, became active in the pouch category. Many of Sweden’s leading snus manufacturers, such as Swedish Match, Skruf and AG Snus created their nicotine pouch brands (ZYN, Shiro, Swave etc) as a direct response to demand for a nicotine option with less conspicuous, smokeless usage. While discreet and tobacco-free, nicotine pouches can still, potentially, cause some side effects like: hiccups, gum irritation, nausea and headaches. 

It is unclear whether smokers might switch to nicotine pouches or if they would continue to smoke and use nicotine pouches, resulting in dual use. Nicotine pouches typically cost about as much as a pack of regular cigarettes. Unlike vaping products, they require no batteries and no accessory device.

Nicotine pouches may entice youth as well as young adult never-smokers because they are available in an array of flavours and may be used unobtrusively.

In pharmacies in Norway, Finland, Denmark, and Sweden, nicotine pouches are also sold as a delivery mechanism for nicotine replacement therapy. In Norway the brand Zonnic is approved by the Norwegian Medicines Agency for smoking cessation.

Contents 

In addition to nicotine, the pouches typically contain food-grade fillers, sweeteners, and flavorings. The main ingredient in nicotine pouches in terms of volume is plant fibre. Plant fibers are used to fill the pouch and give it the desired shape, fit, and properties. Different brands use different fibers but some of the most common derive from eucalyptus and pine. Nicotine pouches are sold in an array of flavors, such as peppermint, black cherry, coffee and citrus, among many others. The nicotine content among nicotine pouch brands typically varies from 1 mg/pouch to 10  mg/pouch although some have much more. Nicotine pouches usually have a longer shelf-life than traditional snus.

Research 

Nicotine pouches contain the addictive chemical nicotine. Nicotine has widespread effects on the body and may contribute to some disorders. Nicotine should be avoided in pregnancy.

While nicotine is not a carcinogen according to the IARC monograph, a meta-analysis paper by members of Tata Memorial Hospital in Mumbai, India, state that nicotine may be carcinogenic and has widespread adverse effects on many systems of the body. According to the Royal College of Physicians nicotine in itself is not a highly hazardous drug. RCP also states that it is unlikely that nicotine itself contributes significantly to the mortality or morbidity caused by smoking, and that if nicotine could be delivered to smokers without smoke, most, if not all of the harm of smoking can probably be avoided.

Opposition 
Advocacy groups opposed to the introduction of nicotine pouches in Kenya have protested that they may raise the risk of cancer, heart disease, and reproductive or developmental harms. The Kenya Tobacco Control Alliance alleged that given the higher levels of some toxic chemicals, and what the U.S. Food and Drug Administration said was a lack of medical data showing the pouches are safer than cigarettes (as claimed by manufacturer British American Tobacco), the government should not license the product.

Classification 

Nicotine pouches are regulated differently around the world. In some countries, like Norway and Canada, their sale in general stores are banned because they are classified as a new nicotine product. In other countries, they are sold freely, because they do not classify as a tobacco product due to their lack of tobacco. They are banned in Germany, but are available in Sweden. Although nicotine pouches are not heavily regulated in the European Union, some regulatory characteristics fall under the European Union CLP-Regulation (EC) 1272/2008.

It is assumed nicotine pouches are classified as tobacco products in the US because they contain nicotine obtained from tobacco.

Tobacco-free nicotine pouches were for sale in Norway from 2014 to 2018, under the name Epok. In June 2018 the Norwegian Directorate of Health forced British American Tobacco Norway to remove Epok from sale. The Norwegian Directorate of Health argued that since Epok didn't contain any tobacco, it was a new form of nicotine product, distinct from the other forms of snus approved in Norway. Approval for the nicotine pouch brand ZYN had already been rejected twice for a very similar product. Within days of the ban, Epok was re-introduced to the Norwegian market, with a minute amount of bleached tobacco added, to qualify as snus, an already approved form of nicotine product. As of July 2022, Epok is still sold by Norwegian grocery stores.

In Canada, nicotine is considered a prescription drug, therefore personal imports of nicotine products are prohibited.  Exceptions exist for those who are a health practitioner or medical practitioner, a drug manufacturer, a wholesale druggist, a pharmacist, or a resident of a foreign country while a visitor in Canada.

References 

2019 introductions
Non-tobacco nicotine products